Clickpop Records is an independent record label in Bellingham, Washington that releases music predominantly from the Pacific Northwest. Bands who have achieved this goal to some degree include Idiot Pilot (who signed with Reprise Records shortly after releasing the first album) and The Trucks who have gained a nationwide audience and have been featured on the cable TV program The L Word.

Founded by Paul Turpin and Dave Richards, the label has also put out albums by Kristin Allen-Zito (a member of The Trucks), Jenni Potts, Black Eyes & Neckties, Darin Schaffer, Scatterbox, Prosser, and Delay. From 2006 through 2007, the label had a co-release deal with SpinArt Records. This resulted in widespread promotion and distribution through Rykodisc, particularly regarding early albums by The Trucks and Prosser that were released during that time. There is also an electronic music imprint, Memex Records, which was created in 2006.

Catalog
 cp001 - Idiot Pilot Strange We Should Meet Here - 2004
 cp002 - Kristin Allen-Zito Helium - 2004
 cp003 - Prosser Prosser (s/t) - 2006
 cp004 - The Trucks The Trucks (s/t) - 2006
 cp005 - Delay Delay (s/t) - 2007
 cp006 - The Trucks]] Titties EP (remixes) - 2007
 cp007 - Jenni Potts The Fourth EP - 2007
 cp008 - Jenni Potts Take This and Go - 2008
 cp009 - The Trucks Zombie remix CD EP - 2008
 cp010 - The Trucks Zombie remix 12" Vinyl - 2008
 cp011 - The Trucks Never Forever - 2008
 cp012 - Various artists compilation Music from the Center of the Universe (Bellingham) Vol. 1 - 2008
 (co-released with Murder Mountain Records - cat is also MMR009
 cp013 - Black Eyes & Neckties Apparition! - 2008

See also
 List of record labels

References

External links
 Official site

American independent record labels
Companies based in Bellingham, Washington